"Eien Yori Nagaku/Drive me crazy" is Mai Kuraki's thirty-third single, released on March 3, 2010.

Track listing

Charts

External links
Kuraki Mai Official Website

2010 singles
2010 songs
Mai Kuraki songs
Song recordings produced by Daiko Nagato
Songs written by Mai Kuraki